This is a list of defunct airlines from the Netherlands Antilles.

See also
List of airlines of the Netherlands Antilles
List of airlines of Aruba
List of airports in the Netherlands Antilles

References

Netherlands Antilles
Airlines
Airlines, defunct